Izgrev/Kalimantsi Airport  is a public use airport located 1 nm south-southeast of Izgrev, Varna, Bulgaria.

See also
List of airports in Bulgaria

References

External links 
 Airport record for Izgrev/Kalimantsi Airport at Landings.com

Airports in Bulgaria
Varna Province